OWJC may refer to:
Okazaki Women's Junior College
Okinawa Women's Junior College